Idrissa Nama Laïco Traore is a Malian footballer, who is currently playing for Djoliba AC, which represented as Captain.

Career 
He started his senior career in the spring of 2007 with Centre Salif Keita. He played for the club until the summer of 2010 and then signed for Djoliba AC. In the summer of 2013 Traore joined Esteghlal Khuzestan F.C. in the Iran Pro League, on loan. He made 25 appearances during the 2013-2014 season and was one of Esteghlal Khuzestan's most solid players.

International 
Traoré is also since 2009 member of the Mali national football team and scored three goals in five games.

References

1990 births
Living people
Malian footballers
Djoliba AC players
Association football midfielders
Expatriate footballers in Iran
Esteghlal Khuzestan players
JS Centre Salif Keita players
Malian expatriate footballers
Mali international footballers
21st-century Malian people
Mali A' international footballers
2014 African Nations Championship players
Malian expatriate sportspeople in Iran
2011 African Nations Championship players